KFNL may refer to:

 The ICAO code for Fort Collins-Loveland Municipal Airport in Loveland, Colorado, United States
 King Fahad National Library
 KFNL-FM, a radio station (104.3 FM) in Spring Valley, Minnesota, United States
 KBMW-FM, a radio station (92.7 FM) in Kindred, North Dakota, United States, which held the call sign KFNL from 2007 to 2013